Josef Martinelli (born 19 March 1936) is a German former football player and manager who played as a midfielder or forward.

References

1936 births
Living people
German footballers
Association football midfielders
Association football forwards
Bundesliga players
Alemannia Aachen players
Roda JC Kerkrade players
German football managers
Alemannia Aachen managers
West German expatriate footballers
West German expatriate sportspeople in the Netherlands
Expatriate footballers in the Netherlands
West German footballers
People from Würselen
Sportspeople from Cologne (region)
Footballers from North Rhine-Westphalia
West German football managers